Sable River  is a rural community of the Municipality of the District of Shelburne in the Canadian province of Nova Scotia.

Parks
  Sable River Provincial Park

References
Sable River Provincial Park

Communities in Shelburne County, Nova Scotia
General Service Areas in Nova Scotia